Abbas–Mustan is an Indian filmmaking duo consisting of brothers Abbas Alibhai Burmawalla and Mustan Alibhai Burmawalla, known for directing stylish suspense, action and romantic thrillers in Bollywood with dark-lighted themes.

Early life and career

Abbas Burmawalla, Mustan Burmawalla, and their brother Hussain Burmawalla are from Surat in Gujarat state. They began their career with Gujarati films. They joined Sultan Ahmed as assistant director who was directing the movie Ganga Ki Saugandh (1978). They later joined as assistant director with Govindbhai Patel to do several films. When Patel refused an opportunity to direct Gujarati film Sajan Tara Sambharana (1985), Abbas–Mustan received their first break to direct the movie, launching their career.

Their first Hindi movie as directors was Agneekaal in 1990. Since then, they have directed more than 14 Hindi movies. They eventually launched their own production house called Burmawalla Partners.

Asian Academy of Film & Television honored both of them with the Life Membership of International Film And Television Club.

Filmography

References

External links

 
 

Hindi-language film directors
Dawoodi Bohras
Indian filmmaking duos
20th-century births
Living people
Year of birth missing (living people)
People from Surat
20th-century Indian film directors
21st-century Indian film directors
Film directors from Gujarat